The Natal banana frog (Afrixalus spinifrons) is a species of frog in the family Hyperoliidae.
It is found in South Africa and possibly Lesotho.
Its natural habitats are temperate forests, temperate shrubland, swamps, intermittent freshwater marshes, arable land, rural gardens, ponds, and canals and ditches.
It is threatened by habitat loss.

References

Afrixalus
Amphibians of South Africa
Taxonomy articles created by Polbot
Amphibians described in 1862